KTTK 90.7 FM is a radio station licensed to Lebanon, Missouri.  The station broadcasts a Southern Gospel format and is owned by Lebanon Educational Broadcasting Foundation.

References

External links
KTTK's website

Southern Gospel radio stations in the United States
TTK